This is a list of South African television related events from 2002.

Events
March - The South African version of Pop Idol debuts on M-Net.
17 June - Heinz Winckler wins the first season of Idols South Africa.
June - Release date of Heinz Winckler's debut single, "Once in a Lifetime".
30 June - Bill Flynn is voted winner of Celebrity Big Brother.
13 October - Richard Cawood wins the second season of Big Brother.

Debuts

Domestic
March - Idols South Africa (M-Net) (2002–present)

International
29 January -  The Guardian (M-Net)
31 January -  24 (M-Net)
7 February -  According to Jim (SABC2)
14 May -  Scrubs (M-Net)
15 July -  The Parkers (SABC1)
18 July -  Alias (M-Net)
30 July -  Soul Food (SABC1)
4 August - / Andromeda (SABC1)
7 August -  Smallville (M-Net)
20 December - / Mutant X (SABC3)
27 December -  Band of Brothers (M-Net)
 The Lampies (M-Net)
 Angelina Ballerina (M-Net)
 The Secret Life of Us (M-Net)
 Merlin the Magical Puppy (M-Net)
 What About Mimi? (M-Net)
 Tracey McBean (M-Net)
 Kim Possible (SABC1)
 Medabots (SABC2)
 Dragon Ball Z (SABC2)
 Teamo Supremo (SABC1)
 Bill and Ben (M-Net)
 The Zeta Project (M-Net)
 Outriders (M-Net)
 Lizzie McGuire (M-Net)

Changes of network affiliation

Television shows

1980s
Good Morning South Africa (1985–present)
Carte Blanche (1988–present)

1990s
Top Billing (1992–present)
Generations (1994–present)
Isidingo (1998–present)
Who Wants to Be a Millionaire? (1999–2005)

Ending this year
Big Brother (2001-2002, 2014–present)

Births

Deaths

See also
2002 in South Africa